The Loh Guan Lye Specialists Centre is a 273-bed private hospital in the city of George Town in Penang, Malaysia. Located at Macalister Road, it was established in 1975 and has been expanded over the years. The hospital now consists of three wings - the Main Wing, a Diagnostic Wing, and a Women & Children Wing.

History 
The hospital, founded in 1975, was named after its founder, Dr Loh Guan Lye. It has since been expanded, with the completion of a 10-storey wing in 2009.

Services 
Among the services provided by the hospital are as follows.
 Gastroenterology, hepatology and therapeutic endoscopy
 Endocrine surgery
 Breast surgery
 Radiotherapy
 Chemotherapy
 Cardiology and cardiothoracic surgery
 Orthopedic surgery
 Otorhinolaryngology
 Obstetrics
 Gynaecology
 Colorectal surgery
 Neurosurgery
 Neurology
 Urology
 Cochlear implant
 CT scanning
 In vitro fertilisation

See also 
 List of hospitals in Malaysia

References 

Hospitals in Penang
Hospitals established in 1975